Edmondson Park railway station is a station on the South West Rail Link which serves the south-western Sydney suburb of Edmondson Park. It opened on 8 February 2015. It is part of the Sydney Trains network.

History
Edmondson Park has one island platform with two faces. Initial services consisted of a half-hourly shuttle between Leppington and Liverpool. From 13 December 2015, trains operate directly to the city via Granville. From 26 November 2017, Cumberland Line services stop at the station, providing a link to Parramatta, Blacktown, Schofields and Richmond.

Platforms & services

Transport links
Interline Bus Services operate three routes via Edmondson Park station:
859: to Carnes Hill
868: to Glenfield
869: Liverpool station to Ingleburn station

References

External links

Edmondson Park station details Transport for New South Wales

Easy Access railway stations in Sydney
Railway stations in Sydney
Railway stations in Australia opened in 2015
South West Rail Link
City of Liverpool (New South Wales)